Nicoli Nattrass is a professor of economics at the University of Cape Town (UCT) in South Africa. She is the Co-Director of the Institute for Communities and Wildlife in Africa (iCWild), and was the founding director of the Centre for Social Science Research (CSSR) and previously the director of the AIDS and Society Research Unit (ASRU) within the CSSR (one of the first academic organisations in South Africa to study the socio-economic and political impacts of the HIV/AIDS epidemic).
Nattrass was active in the anti-Apartheid struggle and is an internationally recognized scholar. Her published work is mainly in the area of the political economy of South Africa, AIDS policy (focusing in the struggle for antiretroviral treatment), labour-intensive growth and human wildlife conflict.
Nattrass has twice won UCT's book award which recognises outstanding books written by members of staff.
Her most widely cited work was written with her husband, Jeremy Seekings on Class Race and Inequality in South Africa.

During the period of AIDS denialism in South Africa, Nattrass was an advocate of public access to science-based AIDS treatment. In the court-case brought by civil society organisations against the South African state, Nattrass authored an affidavit in which she modelled the cost-effectiveness of HIV medicines as both a public health and human rights imperative.
Nattrass was critical of Thabo Mbeki's AIDS policy in South Africa, and was threatened with libel charges by a Government Minister for documenting the South African Cabinet's support for unproven HIV treatments.
Nattrass's research on the cost-effectiveness of HIV treatment formed part of the Treatment Action Campaign's successful constitutional court case to force the Mbeki government to provide public access to antiretroviral treatment for HIV-positive people.

In a study published in 2008, Nattrass estimated that more than 340,000 unnecessary AIDS deaths in South Africa between 1999 and 2007 were the result of this policy. The results of this study were later corroborated, using a different methodology, by scientists at Harvard University. They too modelled AIDS-related mortality and morbidity in South Africa as the result of the government's decision not to provide public access to HIV medicines.

Academic background 

Nattrass received her undergraduate degrees from Stellenbosch University, an honours degree from the University of Cape Town, a Master's degree from the University of Natal, and a M.SC and DPhil from Oxford University. In 1984, she was awarded the Rhodes Scholar, which funded her doctoral studies.

Works to counter AIDS denialism 

Between 2002 and 2012, Nattrass published a number of academic articles and books to examine the history, sources, characteristics of AIDS denialism and its impact on HIV prevention and AIDS treatment.

In her book The Moral Economy of AIDS in South Africa, written at the height of AIDS denialism, Nattrass repudiated the South African government's claim that antiretroviral drugs (ARVs) were unaffordable. She demonstrated that by not implementing mother to child transmission prevention programs, the cost to treat sick children who acquired AIDS from their mother was greater than to prevent the tragedy from happening.

Nattrass estimated that Mbeki's denialist policies led to the early deaths of more than 340,000 South Africans and 171,000 infections, which she likened to 'genocide'.  She attributed the slow and ineffective governmental response to the country's massive AIDS epidemic directly to the influence of the AIDS denialists.

In her 2012 article in Skeptical Inquirer and book The AIDS Conspiracy: Science Fights Back, Nattrass examines the landscape of the AIDS denialist community and identifies four groups of characters: hero scientists (provide scientific credibility); cultropreneurs (promote non-evidence based, unproven alternative treatment); living icons (proof that HIV is not the cause of AIDS) and praise singers (journalists and film makers who promote the cause). She observes that they each fill their own important role in the intractable propagation of the movement and their intertwined and symbiotic relationships are established through their shared anti-science and conspiratorial stance, and beliefs in alternative medicine and treatment. Nattrass describes how pro-science activists fought back by deploying empirical evidence and giving political credibility to refute AIDS conspiracy theories, as part of the crucial project to defend evidence-based medicine and combat pseudoscience.

Race and Class 

Nattrass has produced a large body of work with Jeremy Seekings on race and class in South Africa. In their first book, Race Class and Inequality in South Africa (Yale University Press, 2005) they argued that during the 20th century, race gave way to class as the driver of inequality in South Africa, especially after the rise in unemployment from the mid-1970s. Their later work, notably 'Policy, Politics and Poverty in South Africa (London, Palgrave Macmillan, 2015) and 'Inclusive Dualism' (Oxford, Oxford University Press, 2019) highlighted growing class differentiation and the ongoing salience of race in South Africa.

In 2020 Nattrass published a 'Commentary' in the South African Journal of Science that proved controversial for suggesting that attitudes towards wildlife and conservation as well as materialist values were more important than race in predicting study and career choices pertaining to wildlife conservation. Some critics read the Commentary as being based on harmful racial stereotypes leading to calls for the Commentary to be withdrawn. Prof Tomaselli later described the furore as a moral panic'. The Academy of Science of South Africa, which hosts the South African Journal of Science, issued a statement defending academic freedom and editorial independence, and announced that a special issue would be dedicated to debating the issue.
Nattrass defended herself in the media (see e.g.) The Democratic Alliance, South Africa's official opposition party also came out in support of Nattrass and academic freedom and issued its own statement.
On 10 July 2020, the South African Journal of Science published as special issue on the Nattrass Commentary with a reply by Nattrass to critics.

Other works 

For more information on Nattrass's other work, see her Google Scholar page https://scholar.google.co.za/citations?user=XAekuekAAAAJ&hl=en

Awards 
 Nattrass's first book on the subject of AIDS, The Moral Economy of AIDS in South Africa won the 2005 University of Cape Town book award and the 2008 Bill Venter/Altron Literary Award.
 University of Cape Town distinguished teacher award 2001.

References

External links
 

Living people
21st-century South African economists
South African women economists
Members of the Academy of Science of South Africa
Health economists
Labor economists
Political economists
Academic staff of the University of Cape Town
HIV/AIDS in South Africa
HIV/AIDS denialism
South African Rhodes Scholars
South African science writers
Year of birth missing (living people)
Place of birth missing (living people)
Stellenbosch University alumni
University of Natal alumni
Alumni of the University of Oxford
Women political scientists
20th-century South African economists